Javorje is a village in the Municipality of Hrpelje-Kozina in the Littoral region of Slovenia.

The local church is dedicated to Saint John the Evangelist and belongs to the Parish of Hrušica.

References

External links

Javorje on Geopedia

Populated places in the Municipality of Hrpelje-Kozina